Faces of Love is a 2007 Filipino film directed by Eddie Romero and starring Christopher de Leon and Angel Aquino with supporting actors Alfred Vargas, Bembol Roco, Mon Confiado, Chanda Romero and Juliana Palermo. It was Romero's first digital film, but also his penultimate film.

Cast
 Christopher de Leon
 Angel Aquino
 Alfred Vargas
 Juliana Palermo
 Chinggoy Alonzo
 Jackie Aquino
 Mon Confiado
 Ricky Davao
 Mavee Lozano
 Bembol Roco
 Chanda Romero
 Rodel Velayo

References

External links
 

2007 films
Films directed by Eddie Romero
Philippine drama films
2000s Tagalog-language films